Fleetville is an unincorporated community in Lackawanna County, Pennsylvania, United States. Fleetville has a post office with ZIP code 18420.

The Cupillari Observatory of Keystone College is located in Fleetville.

References

Unincorporated communities in Lackawanna County, Pennsylvania
Unincorporated communities in Pennsylvania